George A. Tice (born 1938) is an American photographer. His work depicts a broad range of American life, landscape, and urban environment, mostly photographed in his native New Jersey. He has lived all his life in New Jersey, except for his service in the U.S. Navy, a brief period in California, a fellowship in the United Kingdom, and summer workshops in Maine, where he taught at the Maine Photographic Workshops, now the Maine Media Workshops.

Early life and entry into photography

George A. Tice was born in Newark, New Jersey, on October 13, 1938, the son of a college-educated New Jerseyan, William S. Tice, and Margaret Robertson, a Traveller of Irish, Scottish, and Welsh stock with a fourth grade education. George was raised by his mother, maintaining regular visiting contact with his father, whose influence and advice he valued highly.

His first contact with photography was in the albums of family photographs belonging to his father, and this gave him the desire to create images of his own. He began with a Kodak Brownie. In 1953, having bought a Kodak Pony, which gave him some control over exposure and focus, and a Kodak developing kit, he began to advance his craft. He also joined the Carteret Camera Club. Tice's photographs of homeless men on the Bowery won second place in the black-and-white print competitions. He decided at this point to make photography his career.

In 1955 he attended the Newark Vocational and Technical High School, where he briefly studied commercial photography under Harve Wobbe. When he turned sixteen, he quit school and took a job as a darkroom assistant for Classic Photo, a portrait studio in Newark. He also worked as a stock boy at Kreske's Department Store in Newark, then as an office boy in the circulation department of the Newark Evening News. It was at this job he learned about the death of the actor James Dean through a clipping about his death. Tice later adopted Dean as one of his subjects in Hometowns: An American Pilgrimage.

In 1956 Tice enlisted in the United States Navy, in which he rose to the rank of Photographer's Mate Third Class. After boot camp and two years at Naval Air Station Memphis, he was transferred to sea duty aboard the aircraft carrier, USS Wasp (CV-18). One of the photographs he made on board, Explosion Aboard the U.S.S. Wasp, 1959, was published on the front page of the New York Times. Edward Steichen, then Director of Photography at the Museum of Modern Art, was struck by the image and requested a print for the Museum collection. In that same year Tice received his honorable discharge.

Early career

In 1960, now a civilian, Tice joined the Vailsburg Camera Club and took a job as a family portrait photographer for Americana Portraits. As an active member of the club, he exhibited in international salons. That same year he began to make short trips to Lancaster County, Pennsylvania to photograph the Amish and Mennonite communities, using 35mm and medium format cameras. In 1964 he began his series of tree photographs. By then he had learned all he could from the disciplines of the camera club and brought his involvement to an end. Tice had his first solo exhibition at the Underground Gallery, New York and then decided to move with his family to California, where he continued his work in family portraits, but pursuing artistic projects like his series on the ghost town of Bodie, California on the edge of the Sierra Nevada range.

When his wife, Marie, became homesick, he returned to New Jersey, where, as he had learned, the family portrait business was considerably more profitable than on the West Coast. In 1967 he bought a 4 x 5 Deardorff view camera and made studies of ice formations. In the same year he traded in his 4 x 5 for an 8 x 10 view camera and began his aquatic plant series. He also produced his first photographs of Paterson, New Jersey, which became the subject of two books and exhibitions, Paterson and Paterson II. The following year he published The Amish Portfolio, a set of twelve, limited-edition prints with an introduction by Jacob Deschin. With his advance from Doubleday for Fields of Peace he bought a brand new 8 x 10 Deardorff, which remains his preferred instrument today.

Maturity

Tice met Lee Witkin in 1968 and used his knowledge of photography and its history to help him establish the Witkin Gallery in New York, one of the first successful galleries of photographic prints as fine art. He issued the portfolio, Trees, taught a workshop at Aspen, Colorado, and began to experiment with platinum printing, a lost art since the First World War, when wartime platinum prices forced the manufacturers of the special printing paper out of business. The only documentation of the process consisted of William Willis' original patents, which did not provide enough information for Tice to prepare the paper and use it to make prints. Tice had to reinvent the platinum printing for himself. He published what he learned in an article, "The Lost Art of Platinum," in the December 1970 issue of the British photography journal, Album, edited by Bill Jay. Tice's experimentation with early photographic processes continued in 1972 with his creation of a photogenic drawing of leaves printed in a contact frame exposed to sunlight onto hand-sensitized paper coated with diluted silver nitrate, in the manner of William Henry Fox Talbot, producing a Calotype negative.

In 1970, Doubleday published Tice's first book, Fields of Peace: A Pennsylvania German Album, with text by Millen Brand. He began photographing coastal Maine this year and began teaching at the New School for Social Research. That year, he also traveled to London and Paris with Lee Witkin in search of material for the Witkin Gallery. They met with Frederick H. Evans' son, who sold Witkin a block of platinum prints and lantern slides. Tice bought some himself, a significant addition to his collection of photographs.

In 1971, Tice issued his portfolio, Bodie, with an introduction by Lee Witkin, printed an Evans portfolio from lantern slides, and published, again with Doubleday, Goodbye River Goodbye, with poetry by George Mendoza. In 1972 Life magazine sent him on assignment for the article "Home to Iowa." Rutgers University Press published Paterson, and the Metropolitan Museum of Art presented a solo exhibition, Paterson, New Jersey. Doubleday published Seacoast, Maine: People and Places, with a text by Martin Dibner.

With several books, the Metropolitan Museum exhibition, and representation by Witkin, Tice was established as a major figure in black and white fine art photography. Awards followed. Tice received fellowships from the National Endowment for the Arts and the Guggenheim Foundation. Paterson was awarded the Grand Prix du Festival d'Arles. Edward Steichen, then in the last year of his life, appointed Tice as printer of his negatives, a duty Tice continued until 1998, printing several important portfolios of Steichen's work. Tice also made prints for portfolios of photographs by Frederick H. Evans, Francis Bruguière, and Edward Weston, issued by the Witkin Gallery. Ansel Adams recommended Tice for a commission by the Field Museum of Natural History, Chicago, to make two sixty-foot murals of Sapelo Island, Georgia, Life magazine sent Tice to Hutchinson, Kansas to contribute to the Special Report, "One Day in the Life of America." The Witkin Gallery presented a twenty-year retrospective of Tice's work in 1975, accompanied by the book, George A. Tice, Photographs: 1953-1973, published by the Rutgers University Press.

Tice was then thirty-seven. This retrospective marked a crucial point in his career. He had published three major books—Fields of Peace, Paterson, and Seacoast Maine—and received the support and recognition of major foundations and museums: the Metropolitan, MoMA (through Steichen), the Field Museum, the Festival d'Arles, the NEA, and the Guggenheim. Tice was established as a classic observer of the American landscape, both urban and rural, and the world of the working American. From then on, he explored his essential subjects in further depth, continued to illustrate the paths of change in America, and to extend them with increased attention to human subjects. Not only did he train his eye and technique on the structures and environments Americans had created for themselves over centuries to live and work in, he began to examine people directly—always in the context of their environment, growth, and history, and always with a sympathetic spirit of inquiry. Over the next decades he developed as a photographer-historian—a quality he had already shown in his interest in the history of photography as a collector and in his study and adoption of historical techniques.

Around 1976/77 Tice acquired a Fujica soft-focus lens, and in this he found another avenue to explore the history of photography and to invent it once again for his own artistic purposes. He was fascinated by the firm contours this lens resolved amidst a cloudy glow which emanated from the figure—an effect fundamentally different from those of the methods employed by modern photographers. Over the next two years he made a series of soft-focus photographs of a girlfriend, Deborah, and three white cats, which belonged to one of his daughters.

Urban Landscapes: A New Jersey Portrait followed in 1976, again from the Rutgers University Press, an expansion of Tice's vision of the gritty cities of industrial New Jersey. As in Paterson, Tice explored scenes of the working man's environment that survived only precariously at the time, soon to disappear forever. Although his subject-matter, technique, and style extend far beyond that, almost to the point of universality, the urban scene of New Jersey remains his most familiar vein.

Tice's interest in people manifested itself in a small book unlike any he had produced before: Artie Van Blarcum: An Extended Portrait. Artie was a loyal member of the Tri-County Camera Club. When Tice decided to create a book about him, he reluctantly allowed Tice to follow him around as a witness to his daily life. Artie, then 52, was a New Jersey Everyman. Like his grandfather and father before him, Artie worked in a factory. He led a circumscribed existence, sharing the family house with his brother and following a narrow routine of activities, chief among which were the camera club meetings and his excursions along the New Jersey coast in his motorboat. These, and the exhibitions and competitions organized by the club, set the standards and limits of Van Blarcum's photographic work. At every stage of the photographic process, from choice of subject to final print, Artie sought to please the judges. Hence, his work embodies everything that is typical of camera club photography, commonly identified with obsessive technical perfection and banal subject matter. After Artie's death, Tice presented his archives to William Paterson University, which devoted an exhibition to them, September 8 – October 16, 2015.

Later career 
Tice prepared the extensive texts himself, quoted from his subject, showing a verbal and editorial gift that served him well in future publications, most importantly Lincoln and Hometowns. Tice's reading of Carl Sandburg's Lincoln in 1981 set off an obsession with Abraham Lincoln, which persists to this day in his collection of Lincoln memorabilia. However, his immediate response to Sandburg's book was to venture out over the United States in search of monuments, statues, and namesakes which don't simply commemorate Lincoln but establish his living presence on common street corners and grand public spaces. In the book we travel through Abraham Lincoln's popular legacy, as we visit the Lincoln Memorial as well as the Lincoln Motel and Abe's Disco in Newark, New Jersey.

In 1982 Tice printed a Steichen portfolio, Steichen: Twenty-Five Photographs, and another retrospective monograph, Urban Romantic: The Photographs of George Tice, issued by the esteemed publisher, David R. Godine, marking the beginning of Tice's aim to attempt to equal the quality of his original prints in his books. In 1983 Tice turned to a new subject closely related to Lincoln. He traveled to the Midwest to photograph James Dean's Fairmount, Indiana, Ronald Reagan's Dixon, Illinois, and Mark Twain's Hannibal, Missouri. His fascination with legendary American men inspired him not only to seek out remembrances on every street corner, but to go to the home towns of three Americans who rose from ordinary beginnings to set a historic stamp on society and culture. In his close exploration of the hometowns, he takes the reader on a pilgrimage to honor the men, but above all to honor the social fabric that enabled them to study, create, and rise. The power of the American public high school and the opportunities it provided for actors and writers is especially moving, both in Tice's photographs and in the texts by Dean, Reagan, and Twain in their youth and maturity that Tice selected for the book. Tice had developed into a creator of books as writer and editor as well as a photographer. Tice also regularly taught photography classes at numerous institutions including the Maine Photographic Workshop in Rockport, Maine, and Appalachian Photographic Workshops in Asheville, NC.

The following year, Tice visited the U.S.S.R. on a cultural exchange, leading a group of American photographers together with Cole Weston and made some photographs, primarily street portraits. Lincoln was published by the Rutgers University Press, and Tice printed a second Steichen portfolio, In the Studio, 12 photographs. Lee Witkin died in 1985. Evelyne Daitz took over his gallery and continued to run it until 1999. Further Steichen portfolios appeared in 1986, Juxtapositions, 12 photographs, and 1987, The Blue Sky, 12 photographs. Tice was inducted into the New Jersey Literary Hall of Fame and awarded the "Michael," a prize designed by Michael Graves. Hometowns: An American Pilgrimage, was published by New York Graphic Society in 1988. Ronald Reagan, the only one of Tice's legends still alive at the time, and in office as President, sent Tice a personal letter of appreciation. In 1990, Tice received a joint fellowship from National Museum of Photography, Film, and Television (now the National Media Museum) in Bradford and from Ilkley College, Ilkley in Northern England. The following year they published the work he did as a fellow, Stone Walls, Grey Skies: A Vision of Yorkshire, consisting of moody, atmospheric views of the countryside and coast. A limited edition portfolio was issued by Prestige Art Ltd. An expanded second edition of the book was published in 1993.

In 1992 Tice's interests took a decisive new turn. Ever the historian, Tice began to study his own genealogy, learning that his paternal ancestors were not 19th-century German immigrants, as his father believed, but early arrivals in America. Tice himself is an eleventh-generation American, the descendant of people who emigrated to New Utrecht, Long Island (Brooklyn) from Liège in the seventeenth century. Soon they resettled in New Jersey, founding a long line of farmers and boatmen. Tice's artistic response to what he had learned was a collection of family photographs, letters, and documents related to the family's life in the area where they settled, once called Ticetown, as well as his own photographs of the Tice "Homestead," built by Jacob S. Tice in 1848 and home to four generations of Tices. George Tice found this house, in a dilapidated state, only with difficulty. It collapsed into a heap of rubble during the winter of 2005. This work was published by Lodima Press in 2007.

Tice returned to the urban landscapes of New Jersey in 1994, when he began a project that was published eight years later as George Tice: Urban Landscapes.

In 1997 and 1998, Tice printed more negatives by Steichen for his widow Joanna's book, Steichen's Legacy, and made two maquettes of Steichen's unfinished project, Shadblow, The Final Apprenticeship of Edward Steichen, Tice received a New Jersey State Council on the Arts Fellowship. His revised and expanded edition of Fields of Peace: A Pennsylvania German Album, was published by Godine in 1998. The Witkin Gallery closed in 1999, after thirty years of operation. Godine published George Tice: Selected Photographs, 1953-1999, a pocket-sized retrospective. His work was shown in American Photographs 1900/2000, Part 3, 1968-1999 at the James Danziger Gallery, New York. In 2000 Tice had his first showing at the Ariel Meyerowitz Gallery, New York.  He then began photography for Paterson II. The following year Godine published a pocket-sized retrospective book with the same title as the show. Tice traveled to Verona to oversee production. George Tice: Urban Landscapes was published by W. W. Norton with introduction by Brian Wallis in 2002, accompanied by an exhibition of the same title at the International Center of Photography, New York. The show traveled to the New Jersey State Museum, Trenton, New Jersey and The Museum of Art, University of Maine, Bangor the following year, when he also exhibited at the Point Light Gallery, Sydney, New South Wales.

In 2004, there were further shows at the Candace Perich Gallery in New York and the Zelda Cheatle Gallery in London. That year, Tice traveled to London, Yorkshire, and Belgium, where he oversaw the production of Common Mementoes, a collection of previously unpublished urban landscapes from the 1990s. Five of his photographs were adapted for scenic drops and rear projections for the Broadway musical, Jersey Boys. Tice had an exhibition at the Scott Nichols Gallery in San Francisco, and he resumed work on the Tice genealogy and photography of Ticetown.

In 2006 Tice traveled to Belgium to work with Georges Charlier of Amanasalto for the production of Paterson II. He supervised printing of a special edition of 20 x 24 platinum/palladium prints by Salto. Paterson II was published by Quantuck Lane Press with an essay by A. D. Coleman, "The Poetics of the Quotidian: George Tice's Paterson Photographs." A related exhibition, Paterson II: Photographs by George Tice, opened at the Newark Museum, continuing on to Lambert's Castle, Paterson, the Jordan Schnitzer Museum of Art, at the University of Oregon at Eugene.

Tice contributed to the group show at the J. Paul Getty Museum, Where We Live, Photographs of America, from the Berman Collection. He then began to work on an inventory of his archive. In 2009 David R. Godine published Seacoast Maine, with an introduction by John K. Hanson. This was accompanied by an exhibition at the Peter Fetterman Gallery, Santa Monica.

In 2010 filming began for a documentary about his career, George Tice: Seeing Beyond the Moment, by New Street Productions, premiered in 2013 at the Newark Museum as part of his seventy-fifth birthday celebrations, which included exhibitions at William Paterson University, The Newark Museum, the Scott Nichols Gallery, the Nailya Alexander Gallery, and the Point Light Gallery.

In October 2015 the Lucie Foundation honored Tice with their Lucie Award for Lifetime Achievement at Carnegie Hall.
In 2022 a book of George Tice's photographs titled, Lifework: Photographs 1953-2013, was published by Veritas Editions. Hardcover 12 x 12 inch, 384 pages.

Personal life

George Tice married Joanna Blaylock in 1958, while he was serving in the U.S. Navy. A son, Christopher, was born. They divorced in 1960, following his discharge from the Navy. He met and married Marie Tremmel the same year. They had four daughters: Loretta, Lisa, Lynn, and Jennifer. Tice and Marie Tremmel were divorced in 1977. Married Galina Kirlenco, of Russian descent, in 1984 divorced in 1986.

Awards

1964: Awarded The Frank Roy Fraprie Medal in the 32nd International photographic exhibition at the Boston Camera Club
1973: National Endowment for the Arts Fellowship; Guggenheim Fellowship; Grand Prix du Festival d'Arles
1987: Inducted into the New Jersey Literary Hall of Fame. Awarded the "Michael," designed by Michael Graves
1990: Joint fellowship from National Museum of Photography, Film, and Television and Bradford and Ilkley College, Bradford, UK
1998: New Jersey State Council on the Arts Fellowship
2003: New Jersey State Council for the Humanities Honor Book for Urban Landscapes
2003: Honorary Doctorate from William Paterson University
2015: Lucie Award for Lifetime Achievement

Works

Exhibitions
(solo, except where indicated)
Paterson, New Jersey, Metropolitan Museum of Art, New York, 1972.
Urban Landscapes: A New Jersey Portrait, at Rutgers University Art Gallery (now the Zimmerli Art Museum), 1976.
Liberty State Park: The Master Plan, Museum of Modern Art, New York City (organized by MoMA's Department of Architecture), 1979.
George A. Tice, Photographic Museum of Finland, Helsinki, Finland, 1985.
Main Street to Red Square, Drew University, Madison, New Jersey, 1985.
Stone Walls, Grey Skies and A Retrospective, National Museum of Photography, Film & Television, Bradford, UK, 1991
Urban Landscapes, International Center of Photography, New York, 2002.
George Tice : Urban Landscapes, An American Master, New Jersey State Museum, Trenton, New Jersey, Museum of Art, University of Maine, Bangor, 2003.
George Tice: Paterson, Newark Museum, 2006.
Paterson II: George Tice, William Paterson University, Wayne, New Jersey, 2007.
A to Z: 26 Great Photographs From the Norton Collection, Norton Museum of Art, West Palm Beach, 2013.
Seeing Beyond the Moment The Photographic Legacy and Gifts of George Tice, The Newark Museum, 2013.
Without Adornment: Photographs by George Tice, September 9 through December 13, 2013, William Paterson University Galleries, 2013.

Publications
Fields of Peace: A Pennsylvania German Album. New York: Doubleday, 1970. With an essay by Millen Brand. Rev. ed.: New York: Dutton, 1973. Rev. ed.: Boston: David R. Godine, 1998.
Goodbye, River, Goodbye. New York: Doubleday, 1971. Poetry by George Mendoza.
Paterson. New Brunswick, New Jersey: Rutgers University Press, 1972. Statement by Tice.
Seacoast Maine: People and Places. New York: Doubleday, 1973. With an essay by Martin Dibner.
George A. Tice: Photographs, 1953–1973. New Brunswick, New Jersey: Rutgers University Press, 1975. With an introduction by Lee D. Witkin.
Urban Landscapes: A New Jersey Portrait. New Brunswick, New Jersey: Rutgers University Press, 1975. Statement by Tice.
Artie Van Blarcum: An Extended Portrait.. Danbury, New Hampshire: Addison House, 1977. With an introduction by Tice and an afterword by Robert Coles.
Urban Romantic: The Photographs of George Tice. Boston: David R. Godine, 1982. With an introduction by Tice.
Lincoln. New Brunswick, New Jersey: Rutgers University Press, 1984. With an introduction by Tice.
Hometowns: An American Pilgrimage. Boston: A New York Graphic Society Book, Little Brown & Co., 1988. With an introduction by Tice.
Stone Walls • Grey Skies: A Vision of Yorkshire. Bradford, UK: National Museum of Photography, Film & Television, 1990. With a foreword by Tice and an afterword by Juliet R. V. Barker. Expanded ed.: Bradford, UK: National Museum of Photography, Film & Television, 1992. With a foreword by Tice and an afterword by Juliet R. V. Barker.
George Tice: Selected Photographs, 1953–1999. Boston: David R. Godine, 2001. With a foreword by David R. Godine.
George Tice: Urban Landscapes. New York: International Center of Photography in Association with W.W. Norton, 2002. With a preface by Tice and an introduction by Brian Wallis.
Common Mementos. Revere, Pennsylvania: Lodima, 2005. Statement by Tice.
Paterson II. Quantuck Lane, New York, 2006. With a foreword by Mary Sue Sweeney Price, a preface by Tice and an introduction by A.D. Coleman.
Ticetown. Revere, Pennsylvania: Lodima, 2007. Essay by Tice.
Seldom Seen. Exton, Pennsylvania: Brilliant, 2013. With essays By Michael More and August Kleinzahler.
Lifework: Photographs 1953–2013. Woodinville, Washington: Veritas, 2021. With an essay by Michael Miller and an afterword by Tice.

Filmography

Honoree George Tice, Lucie Foundation
George Tice: Seeing Beyond the Moment, 2013, a documentary written and directed by Bruce Wodder, Peter Bosco, and Douglas Underdahl, High Bridge, NJ, New Street Films.

References

Further reading
 Caponigro, John Paul. Interview with George Tice (first published in View Camera, July/August 1996)
 Sánchez, Maria C. "George A. Tice," in Lynne Warren (ed.) The Encyclopedia of Twentieth Century Photography. New York, London:  Routledge, 2005, pp. 1537–40.
 Tice, George A. Preface to Urban Landscapes: a New Jersey Portrait. New Brunswick, New Jersey: Rutgers University Press, pp. 7–8.
 Tice, George A. Essay on Paterson, New Jersey, Thirty Photographs by George A. Tice. The Metropolitan Museum of Art Bulletin, vol. 30, no. 6 (June–July 1972), excerpted from introductory statement to Paterson. New Brunswick, New Jersey: Rutgers University Press, 1972.

1938 births
20th-century American photographers
Artists from Newark, New Jersey
Living people
Photographers from New Jersey
21st-century American photographers
20th-century American male artists
21st-century American male artists
American people of Irish descent
American people of Scottish descent
American people of Welsh descent